Recess: School's Out (also known as Recess: The Movie – School's Out) is a 2001 American animated comedy adventure film based on the Disney television series Recess, and features the voices of Andrew Lawrence, Rickey D'Shon Collins, Jason Davis, Ashley Johnson, Courtland Mead, Pamela Adlon, Dabney Coleman, Melissa Joan Hart, April Winchell, and James Woods.

As the events of the film take place between the fifth and sixth seasons of Recess, the film centers around T.J. Detweiler and his friends uncovering a plot to get rid of summer vacation taking place at their school. It was produced by Walt Disney Pictures, Walt Disney Television Animation and Walt Disney Television Animation Digital Production with animation done by Sunwoo Animation and Sunwoo Digital International. The film began production in 1998 (during the show's second season) and was finished in 2000.

The film was distributed by Buena Vista Pictures Distribution, premiered on February 10, 2001, and was released theatrically in the United States on February 16, 2001. The film received mixed reviews from critics and performed well at the box office, grossing $44.5 million on a $23 million budget.

Plot
A group of men break into a military base and steal a top-secret project, intending to use Third Street School as their headquarters. After pranking on Principal Prickly on the last day of school before summer vacation, T.J. Detweiler is excited to spend the time off with his friends, only to be disappointed to learn they will all be attending different summer camps. Resigned to spending the summer alone, T.J. notices strange activity at Third Street School. Investigating further, he sees scientists performing strange experiments with a tractor beam. After neither his parents nor the police believe him, he goes to Prickly, who prepares to show T.J. the school is empty, but is dematerialized when trying to enter the building. 

Desperate, T.J. blackmails his older sister Becky to drive him to all the camps to retrieve his friends. They all return with him to Third Street School, but accuse him of deceit after recovering a box of inconsequential documents from the school. T.J.'s suspicions are verified when they all see a giant laser emerging from the school roof and formulate a plan of camp during the day and meeting up at night. After T.J. finds Prickly's discarded pants with a note reading "Help Me!" in the pocket, the gang infiltrate the school to rescue him. School snitch Randall Weems, who has been eavesdropping on them, goes to inform deputy principal Muriel Finster.

The kids find the auditorium has been turned into a laboratory. T.J. is captured by guards while his friends escape and is imprisoned with Prickly. They both discover that Prickly's old friend Dr. Phillium Benedict is overseeing the operation inside the school. Prickly exposits Benedict's background to T.J.: in 1968, while he, Benedict and Finster were all in teacher training, Benedict was appointed Principal of Third Street School and proposed abolishing recess to improve test grades. Prickly asked the superintendent to encourage Benedict to rescind, but when he declined, he was replaced as principal with Prickly, and Finster dumped him. Swearing revenge on Prickly, Benedict became secretary of education but was fired by the President for reattempting to abolish recess nationwide.

While T.J.’s friends review the recovered papers, Spinelli finds a date book that mentions lunar perigee (taking place at 12:22 pm the next day). Gretchen realizes the machine they saw is a tractor beam and concludes that Benedict intends to use it to move the moon when it nears Earth. T.J. and Prickly get to Prickly’s office, where they discover Benedict’s plan to eradicate summer vacation by creating a new permanent Ice Age that will force kids indoors year-round. Meanwhile, T.J.’s friends persuade Becky to drive them to the camps and pick up all the other students, while Finster rallies the teachers, and Gus takes charge, concocting a plan to infiltrate the school.

As Benedict prepares to enact his plan in the auditorium, the students and teachers of Third Street School all attempt to stop him and his henchmen. During the ensuing battle, Benedict attempts to activate the beam himself but is stopped by Prickly, only for Benedict to break the controls and make the process irreversible. T.J. instructs Vince to throw a baseball at the beam, which destroys it. Finally aware of Benedict's plot, the police arrive at the school to arrest him and his henchmen. T.J.'s friends decide to spend the rest of their summer together. T.J. thanks Prickly in his office, who in turn thanks T.J. for reminding him why he started teaching: to help kids. T.J. then joins his friends as Prickly jokingly reminds T.J. he will still be reprimanded for his earlier prank when September comes.

Cast

 Andrew Lawrence as Theodore Jasper "T.J." Detweiler, the leader of the Recess gang.
 Rickey D'Shon Collins as Vince LaSalle, T.J.’s athletic best friend. 
 Jason Davis as Mikey Blumberg, an obese boy with an operatic singing voice.
 Robert Goulet as Mikey's singing voice. This was Goulet's final theatrical film role before his death in 2007.
 Ashley Johnson as Gretchen Grundler, the intelligent strategist of the gang / Ashley Tomassian, one of the Ashleys. 
 Courtland Mead as Gus Griswald, a timid boy with high military knowledge.
 Pamela Adlon as Ashley Spinelli, a violent, short-fused tomboy who doesn’t really like her first name because of it being associated with the Ashleys group. 
 Dabney Coleman as Principal Peter Prickly, the principal of Third Street School.
 Melissa Joan Hart as Becky Detweiler, T.J.’s older sister who later becomes the assistant manager at Floppy Burger.
 April Winchell as Ms. Muriel Finster, the deputy principal of Third Street School and a professional boxer / Mrs. Detweiler, T.J. and Becky’s mother.
 James Woods as Dr. Phillium Benedict, Principal Prickly’s former best friend, and the mastermind of the plot to eradicate summer vacation.
 Peter MacNicol as Professor Fenwick, Dr. Benedict’s second-in-command. 
 Diedrich Bader as Guard #2
 Allyce Beasley as Ms. Alordayne Grotke, a teacher at Third Street School, who specializes in martial arts. 
 Gregg Berger as Tech #1
 Klee Bragger as Digger Sam
 Clancy Brown as "Kojak", AKA Bald Guy, Dr. Benedict’s aggressive chief of security, who has an intense dislike for children, especially T.J.
 Dan Castellaneta as Guard #1
 Lane Toran as King Bob
 Rachel Crane as Ashley Quinlan
 Elizabeth Daily as Captain Sticky
 R. Lee Ermey as Col. O'Malley (credited as Lee Ermey)
 Ron Glass as Dr. Lazenby / Tech #2
 Tony Jay as Dr. Rosenthal, the first head scientist, who is punished after the tractor beam malfunctions.
 Clyde Kusatsu as Mr. Yamashiro
 Charles Kimbrough as Mort Chalk
 Tress MacNeille as Lunchlady Irma / Opera Director / Dr. Steinheimer
 Andrea Martin as Lunchlady Harriet
 Anndi McAfee as Ashley Armbruster, the leader of the Ashleys group.
 Mark Robert Myers as Technician
 Ryan O'Donohue as Digger Dave, one of the two diggers / Randall Weems, the school snitch.
 Philip Proctor as Golfer #2 / Scientist #2
 Patrick Renna as Jordan
 Kevin Michael Richardson as Cop #2
 Jack Riley as Golfer #1
 Justin Shenkarow as Soldier Kid / Wrestler Kid
 Michael Shulman as Hustler Kid
 Francesca Marie Smith as Ashley Boulet / Swinger Girl / Upside Down Girl
 Kath Soucie as Counselor
 Robert Stack as Superintendent
 Ken Swofford as Coach
 Nicholas Turturro as Cop #1
 Erik von Detten as Captain Brad / Erwin Lawson
 Paul Willson as Coach Kloogie / Mr. Detweiler, T.J. and Becky’s father.

Music

Soundtrack

Home media
Recess: School's Out was released on VHS and DVD by Walt Disney Home Video on August 7, 2001. As of November 12, 2019, the film, along with the series, is available to stream on Disney+.

Reception

Box office
The film earned $36.7 million in North America and another $7.8 million from other countries. The worldwide gross was $44.5 million, against a $23 million budget. The film was released in the United Kingdom on July 27, 2001, and opened on #7.

Critical response
On Rotten Tomatoes, a review aggregator, the film has an approval rating of 60% based on 70 reviews, with an average rating is 5.8/10. The site's critical consensus reads, "Though basically a television cartoon stretched out to movie length, Recess has enough successful jokes and smart writing to make it a worthwhile view." On Metacritic, the film has a weighted average score of 43 out of 100, based on 20 critics, indicating "mixed or average reviews". Audiences polled by CinemaScore gave the film an average grade of "A−" on an A+ to F scale.

Roger Ebert of the Chicago Sun-Times, gave the film a two and a half stars out of four, saying, "Parents may find it amusing, but it doesn't have the two track versatility of Rugrats in Paris, which worked for kids on one level, and adults on another." Bob McCabe of Empire Magazine, gave the film a one out of five stars and said, "Even if it did keep the ankle biters quiet for an hour or so, this still wouldn't be worth your money."

Common Sense Media gave the film two out of five stars and said: "Simply a TV episode blown up for the big screen."

References

External links

 
 
 
 
 

Recess (TV series)
2001 films
2001 animated films
2000s American animated films
2000s comedy mystery films
2000s English-language films
American children's animated comedy films
Animated films about children
Animated films about friendship
Animated films based on animated series
DisneyToon Studios animated films
Films about educators
Films about teacher–student relationships
Films about vacationing
Walt Disney Pictures animated films
Disney Television Animation films
Films set in schools
2001 comedy films